Saint-Coulomb is a commune in the Ille-et-Vilaine department in Brittany in northwestern France.

Population
Inhabitants are called colombanais in French.

History
Its name comes from Saint Colomban, who came in the years 580 - 590. Accompanied by several monks, he crossed the English Channel and landed either on the Du Guesclin beach or a few hundreds meters further to the west.

Beaches
This commune has several beaches, very frequented by tourists in summer.

Malouinières
The Malouinières are historic buildings built between 1650 and 1730 within  of Saint Malo, by its shipbuilders who wanted to escape the congested city, while staying close enough to the centre (within two hours on horseback) to take care of their ships and their cargos.

Neighboring communes
 Saint-Malo, to the west
 Cancale, to the east
 Saint-Méloir-des-Ondes, to the south
 North is the sea

References in popular culture 
Saint-Coulomb is the location for Claude Chabrol's 1995 thriller La Cérémonie

See also
Communes of the Ille-et-Vilaine department

References

External links

 Cultural Heritage 
 Pictures and history of Saint-Coulomb

Communes of Ille-et-Vilaine